Sevcon was an eProducts company, that manufactured controls for electric vehicles.

History
Sevcon Engineering Ltd. was founded in 1961. The company was formed to develop technology originated by Horace William Heyman (13 March 1912 - 4 September 1998), who had been Managing Director of Smith Electric Vehicles from 1949 until 1964. It was the largest manufacturer of electric vehicles in Europe.

Heyman's technology improved battery life for frequent start-stop runs of electric vehicles at low speeds. There were always large electrical losses on starting an electric vehicle because of electrical resistances heating up. The technology allowed a 20% reduction in battery size for equivalent power, or increased battery length or power for a standard-sized battery.

An electric vehicle would have had resistances to drop the voltage on the motor when starting, but this created heating. His technology employed semiconductor-controlled rectifiers, with a semiconductor oscillator, which provided pulses of electrical power to power the motor.

It won the Queen's Award to Industry in April 1970, and the Queen's Awards for Export in April 1975. A new factory opened in June 1970 at Gateshead.

It opened its first subsidiary in 1968 in Paris. In 1969 it was bought by Tech/Ops of the US.

In 1988 it was listed on the US stock exchange, then joined the NASDAQ Capital Market in 2009.

In September 2017, following a period of rapid expansion, the company was acquired by BorgWarner.

Structure
Sevcon's head office is situated opposite the automotive centre of Gateshead College. It outsources much of the manufacture of its components to KeyTronic of the US. A UK site manufactures film capacitors.

Its competitors include Danaher's Motion division, and General Electric. In 2010 it spent around £3 million in research and development at Gateshead.

References

External links
Sevcon Official Website
Rockwill Electric Group

1961 establishments in England
Automotive companies of the United Kingdom
Automotive electronics
Companies based in Tyne and Wear
Electronics companies established in 1961
Companies listed on the Nasdaq
Electrical engineering companies of the United Kingdom
Electric vehicles
Gateshead